Su Zhu may refer to:
Hua Guofeng, born 1921 as Su Zhu, former Chairman of the Chinese Communist Party
Su Zhu (businessperson), a founder of cryptocurrency hedge fund Three Arrows Capital in the 2010s